Androcalva fraseri, commonly known as blackfellow's hemp or brush kurrajong,  is a common shrub or small tree of the mallow family found in eastern Australia. Growing up to 8 metres tall, it is found in rainforest margins and in wet eucalyptus forests.

Description
The leaf undersides are whitish, and covered in a fine fur. Flowering peaks in September and continues till November. The small white flowers are arranged in clusters.

Taxonomy
The French naturalist Jacques Etienne Gay was the first to formally describe the species in 1823. He gave it the name Commersonia fraseri and published the description in the journal, Mémoires du Muséum d'Histoire Naturelle.

A 2011 molecular analysis of segments of chloroplast DNA found that the genera Commersonia and Rulingia formed a monophyletic group but that the member species were intermingled, and split out into two hitherto unrecognised clades. In 2011, Carolyn Wilkins and Barbara Whitlock changed the name to Androcalva fraseri.

The specific epithet honours Charles Fraser, an early New South Wales colonial botanist.

Distribution and habitat
Androcalva fraseri is found in rainforest and wet eucalypt forest along and east of the Great Dividing Range in New South Wales and southeastern Queensland. In the latter habitat, it is associated with trees such as rough-barked apple (Angophora floribunda), turpentine (Syncarpia glomulifera), and Sydney blue gum (Eucalyptus saligna). A fast-growing plant, it is able to colonise disturbed ground, particularly areas where vegetation has been partly cleared such as under power lines.

It is an adult host plant for the chrysomelid beetle Podagra submetallica.

Use in horticulture
Androcalva fraseri has been propagated readily from cuttings taken in winter, and grows better with extra moisture in cultivation.

References

External links

Malvales of Australia
Flora of New South Wales
Flora of Queensland
Trees of Australia
Plants described in 1823
fraseri
Taxa named by Jaques Étienne Gay